Tikmah Ajam (also Romanized as Tīkmah ‘Ajam) is a village in Qaleh Darrehsi Rural District, in the Central District of Maku County, West Azerbaijan Province, Iran. At the 2006 census, its population was 130, in 30 families.

References 

Populated places in Maku County